Sayyid Saud bin Hilal bin Hamad al-Busaidi is the Governor of Al Buraimi Governorate in Oman since August 2020. He is also an executive at Vodafone Oman.

Personal life

Early life
Al Busaidi graduated from Florida Institute of Technology, Melbourne, Florida, United States in 2000, Royal Holloway, University of London in 2006 and Victoria University, Melbourne, Australia in 2012.

References

Living people
Florida Institute of Technology alumni
Government ministers of Oman
People from Muscat, Oman
Alumni of Royal Holloway, University of London
Victoria University, Melbourne alumni
Vodafone people
Year of birth missing (living people)